Dry & Heavy is the fifth studio album of the reggae artist Burning Spear, released in 1977 as the third  Island album.

Production
The album was produced by Winston Rodney, and recorded at Harry J's studio. It was the last album to include the musicians known as the Black Disciples.

Critical reception
Fact deemed the album among Burning Spear's "peak-period greats." The Rolling Stone Album Guide wrote that Dry & Heavy "counterbalances the anger and dread of the early albums by displaying a downright optimistic side." PopMatters called it "an absolutely crucial album for Rodney, as it added a whole new arrow of nuance to his quiver—and it is also a really great-sounding reggae album."

Track listing
All tracks composed by Walter Rodney; except where indicated
"Any River" - 3:19
"The Sun" (Rodney, Don Taylor, Phillip Fullwood) - 3:42
"It's A Long Way Around" (Rodney, Fullwood) - 3:06
"I W.I.N." - 3:47
"Throw Down Your Arms" - 4:05
"Dry & Heavy" - 3:29
"Wailing" - 2:46
"Black Disciples" - 4:23
"Shout It Out" - 3:27

Credits
Arranged and produced by Winston Rodney
Executive producer - Don Taylor
Recorded at Harry J Studio Kingston, Jamaica
Engineer - Sylvan Morris
Mixed at Harry J Studio Kingston, Jamaica

Personnel
Winston Rodney - lead vocals and percussion
Robbie Shakespeare - bass guitar
Aston "Family Man" Barrett - bass guitar
Leroy "Horsemouth" Wallace - drums
Bernard "Touter" Harvey - keyboards
Earl "Wire" Lindo – keyboards
Earl "Chinna" Smith - lead and rhythm guitar
Donald "Roots" Kinsey - lead guitar
Bertram "Ranchie" McLean - rhythm guitar
Noel "Skully" Simms - percussion
Uziah "Sticky" Thompson – percussion
Bobby Ellis - trumpet
Richard "Dirty Harry" Hall - tenor sax
Herman Marquis - alto sax
Vincent "Trommie" Gordon – trombone

References

Burning Spear albums
1977 albums
Island Records albums